(Temple of Pain Stadium) is a stadium in Cholula, Puebla, Mexico.  It is primarily used for American football and is the home field of the Aztecas UDLAP.  It holds 4,500  people.

Artilleros Puebla from Liga de Fútbol Americano Profesional (LFA), Mexico's top American football league, also played their home games at the Templo del Dolor for the 2019 season.

References

Universidad de las Américas Puebla
Sports venues in Puebla
College American football venues in Mexico
American football venues in Mexico